The Archers Lacrosse Club is a professional men's field lacrosse team in Premier Lacrosse League (PLL). The Archers are one of the six founding members of the PLL for the 2019 season. Notable players include Scott Ratliff, Tom Schreiber, Marcus Holman, Will Manny, and Kevin Rice.

Roster

*Indicates player is on Unavailable to Travel list

**Indicates player is on PUP list
Source:

(C): Captain

Coaching staff
 Head coach – Chris Bates
 Assistant coach – Tony Resch
 Assistant coach – Brian Kavanagh

All-time Draft selections
2019 College Draft

2020 Entry Draft

The 2020 player entry draft occurred on March 16 for teams to select players arriving from rival Major League Lacrosse. On March 4, Paul Burmeister and NBCSN hosted an entry draft lottery for selection order. Out of 100 balls to select from, Waterdogs had 40, Chrome had 25, Atlas had 15, Archers had 10, Chaos had 6, Redwoods had 3, and the champion Whipsnakes had 1.

Rob Pannell was announced to be transferring to the PLL on March 9, followed by 15 other players the following day, which comprised the selection pool for the entry draft. A total of 14 players were selected in the entry draft with remaining new players entering the league player pool.

2020 College Draft

2021 Entry Draft

2021 College Draft

2022 College Draft

Season Results

PLL Award Winners
Eamon McEneaney Attackman of the Year
 Grant Ament: 2021
Gait Brothers Midfielder of the Year
 Tom Schreiber: 2019, 2020, 2022
Dave Pietramala Defensive Player of the Year
 Graeme Hossack: 2021
George Boiardi Short Stick Midfielder of the Year
 Dominique Alexander: 2019
Welles Crowther Humanitarian Award
 Scott Ratliff: 2019

Head coaches

All-time record vs. PLL Clubs

See also

References

Premier Lacrosse League teams
Lacrosse clubs established in 2019